Youri Messen-Jaschin is an artist of Latvian origin, born in Arosa, Switzerland, in 1941. He often combines oils and gouaches. His favourite colors are: strong reds, yellows, greens, and blue. He also works in body painting, exhibiting his works in nightclubs.

He created three stamps in optical art for Swiss Post, in 2010.,

Biography
Between 1958 and 1962 Youri Messen-Jaschin studied Fine art at the École nationale supérieure des Beaux-Arts (student of Robert Cami) and History of art at the École pratique des hautes études (student of Pierre Francastel), both in Paris.

Between 1962 and 1965, he attended the École cantonale d'art de Lausanne.

He worked with engraver and painter Ernest Pizzotti. He exposed his kinetic glass and acrylic sculptures in Lausanne in 1964. He worked two years at the Center of Contemporary Engraving in Geneva and then in Zürich, where he collaborated with the painter Friederich Kuhn.

Between 1968 and 1970, he studied at the School of Design and Crafts in Göteborg, where he researched textile kinetic objects. There, through his discussions with artists Jesús Rafael Soto, Carlos Cruz-Diez and Julio Le Parc, he became increasingly interested in by Op art and decided to devote all his research to Kinetic art. He started to increasingly integrate movement and geometric shapes in his textiles and oil paintings.

In 1968, he received the first prize for Swiss contemporary engraving art as well as a scholarship from the Swedish government. In 1970, he worked in Hamburg, collaborating with North German artists on monumental projects, and created a kinetic sculpture for Gould in Eichstetten, Germany.

Youri Messen-Jaschin traveled in South America, where he was able to discuss architecture – which plays an important role in his work – and its relations to his own research on movement with architects and artists like Oscar Niemeyer and Roberto Burle Marx in Rio de Janeiro, Ruy Ohtake in São Paulo, and Clorindo Testa in Buenos Aires. In 1984 in Caracas, he staged theatre and choreography of his own works at the Ateneo, the Eugenio Mendoza Foundation, the Asociación Cultural Humboldt (Goethe-Institut), and at the Alliance française.

After a stay of several months in New York, he returned to Switzerland in 1971, where he took up residence in Bern, where he lived for eleven years. During his stay, he frequently exhibited at the Kunsthalle and other local museums. He currently lives in Lausanne, Switzerland.

He participated in many international exhibitions. His works are in private collections, in national and international museums.

Gallery

Exhibitions
 2013 Youri Messen-Jaschin: Op Art, Galerie du Château, Renens, Switzerland
 2018 POPA Museum | Exhibition Youri Messen-Jaschin Op Art | April 20-May 21 | Porrentruy, Switzerland
 2019 Youri Messen-Jaschin | Galerie du Château, Renens, Switzerland | March 15-April 7, 2019

Books and magazines
 2000 Premio Internazionale di scultura "Terzo millenio" Terra Moretti Editor Fiorenza Mursia/Milan/Italy
 2016 Guide Contemporain, volume III, p. 138 | Published by the Fondation Lémanique pour l'Art Contemporain
 2022 Youri Messen-Jaschin, an artist who plays with your brain, Swiss Review, The magazine for the Swiss Abroad, p. 10-11.

Awards
 USA Award Artavita  | 30th international Art Contest | Certificate of excellence | 2019
 USA | Artist of the year award | Award for Wormhole (screen printing) | Foundation for the Art | 2019
 USA | Art Room Contemporary Online Gallery | Merit Award for Excellent Artwork | Feb. 2019

Encyclopedic
 1987 to 1992 Who's and Who international art
 1981 Institut Suisse pour l'étude de l'art, Dictionnaire des artistes suisses contemporains (Swiss institute for the study of art, Dictionary of the contemporary Swiss artists)
 1970–1980, 1980–1990, 1990–2000 Editor Huber Frauenfeld-Stuttgart/Switzerland/Germany
 1999 Dictionnaire biographique de l'art Suisse, Répertoire des artistes suisses/ Institut suisse pour l'étude de l'art Zurich & Lausanne (Biographical dictionary of Swiss art, Repertory of the Swiss artists/Swiss Institute for the study of art Zurich & Lausanne) Editor Neue Zürcher Zeitung/Zurich/Switzerland
 1990–2008 QUID Editor Robert Laffont Paris/France
 2008 Visarte Vaud – 152 creative personalities | Editor League of visual artists and architects Lausanne Switzerland.

Theater
 1982 «PSICOTRONICÓ» Caracas;; 
 1983 «AH! AH! BARROCO» Caracas
 1983 «LA TORTA QUE CAMINA» Caracas;; ;
 1964 «EMBRYO» Caracas;;

References

External links
 Youri Messen-Jaschin | Neurosciences meet Op Art | University Viseu, Portugal
 Brain project News: 1 March 2017 | Association Brain project 1 | Lausanne
 Youri Messen-Jaschin | Weaving | 1960 - 1981
 Youri Messen-Jaschin | Painting - Screen printing | 1960-2016

Swiss sculptors
Body art
1941 births
Living people
Swiss performance artists
Swiss contemporary artists
Op art